Legit is a slang abbreviation of legitimate. It may also refer to:

 Legit (professional wrestling)
 Legit (2006 TV series), Scottish sitcom
 Legit (2013 TV series), created by comedian Jim Jefferies
 Legit Ballin', a record label
 Legit.ng, a Nigerian digital media and news platform
 B-Legit (born 1971), American rapper
 Too Legit to Quit, an MC Hammer album
 Too Legit for the Pit: Hardcore Takes the Rap, an album of cover versions of hiphop songs
 LEGIT (Lesbian and Gay Immigration Task Force), a Canadian organization founded in 1991 that advocates for immigration equality of people with LGBT

See also
Legitimacy (disambiguation)